L. Z. Sailo is an Indian writer and a former captain of the Indian Army. He has also served in the UN Peace Keeping Force at Congo and one of his books, Runlum Nuthai, was selected as the Mizo Academy of Letters Book of the Year in 2002. The Government of India awarded him the Padma Bhushan, the third highest civilian award, in 2007.

References

External links
 
 

Year of birth missing (living people)
Living people
Recipients of the Padma Bhushan in literature & education
Indian writers
People from Mizoram